This is a list of individuals of Moroccan ancestry who grew up and/or live in Germany.

Athletes
Combat sport
 Ottman Azaitar 
 Chalid Arrab
 Nordin Asrih
 

Football
 Karim Bellarabi
 Aziz Bouhaddouz
 Abdelhamid Sabiri
 Aymen Barkok
 Elias Abouchabaka
 Samir Benamar
 Mimoun Azaouagh
 Anas Ouahim
 Adil Chihi
 Mohamed El Bouazzati
 Hamadi Al Ghaddioui
 Mohamed Amsif
 Manuel Schmiedebach
 Mohamed Morabet
 Fikri El Haj Ali
 Rachid El Hammouchi
 Nasir El Kasmi
 Fouad Brighache
 Nassim Boujellab
 Abdelaziz Ahanfouf
 
 Elias Oubella 
 Elias Tamim 
 Mohamed El Bakali 
 Elias Kurt

Rest
 Sanaa Koubaa - runner
 Yassin Idbihi - former basketball player

Musicians
Rapper
 Farid Bang 
 Juju 
 
  
  
 
 
 Ramo 
 
 
 
 MC Rene 
 
 Mo Douzi 
 Mourad Kill

Rapper & singer
 Namika
 

Singer
 Nadja Benaissa 
 Senna Gammour
 Bibi Bourelly
  - DSDS-Finalist 2018

Comedians
 
  
 
 
 Mohamed Sartiane („Momonews“)

Actors
 Yasin El Harrouk alias Yonii (also musician)
 Nisma Cherrat
 
 
 Hicham Lahsoussi

Media & TV 
 Souad Mekhennet (Moroccan father and Turkish mother)

Politicians

Scientists
 Jalid Sehouli - gynaecologist & oncologist

Miscellaneous
 Abdelkader Salhi - serial killer

See also
Moroccans in Germany
List of Moroccan people
Moroccan diaspora

References

Germany
Moroccan